William Russell Birch (9 April 1755 – 7 August 1834) was an English miniature painter, enameler, and landscape engraver and designer.

Life
Birch was born in Warwickshire, the son of Anne, née Russell, and physician Thomas Birch. He spent his early childhood in Warwick and was apprenticed to a jeweler, Thomas Jeffreys, and to Sir Joshua Reynolds. The enamelist Henry Spicer trained Birch in the art of enamel painting. Birch exhibited enamel portraits at the Royal Academy from 1781 to 1794. In 1785, he received a medal from the Royal Society of Arts. As an engraver he is best known in England for his Délices de la Grande Bretagne, consisting of thirty-six plates of ancient buildings in Norwich and elsewhere, published in 1791.

After emigrating to Philadelphia in 1794 he made portrait enamels of many people including copies of portraits of George Washington, by Gilbert Stuart. The engraving series he made in 1800 of Philadelphia vistas was so extremely popular it resulted in three additional editions. William Birch was the father of Thomas Birch, an American portrait and marine painter. Typescript copies of his autobiography are held by the Historical Society of Pennsylvania. He died in Philadelphia, aged 79.

Works
The City of Philadelphia, in the State of Pennsylvania North America. Philadelphia, 1800
The Country Seats of the United States, 1808
Enamel according to Gilbert  Stuart of George Washington, at the Lazaro Galdiano Museum, Madrid.

Notes

References
 Emily T. Cooperman & Lea Carson Sherk, William Birch: Picturing the American Scene (University of Pennsylvania Press, 2010).  The first biography of William Birch, it contains an edited version of his autobiography.

External links
William Russell Birch subscription lists, 1798-1802 (Smithsonian: Archives of American Art)
William Russell Birch and Thomas Birch (ushistory.org)
Search results for 'William Russell Birch' (The Metropolitan Museum of Art)
The Country Seats of the United States (University of Pennsylvania Press)
American paintings & historical prints from the Middendorf collection, an exhibition catalog from The Metropolitan Museum of Art (fully available online as PDF), which contains material on Birch (no. 11 & 70)

1755 births
1834 deaths
19th-century American painters
American male painters
18th-century English painters
English male painters
19th-century English painters
English engravers
People from Warwick
Portrait miniaturists
English emigrants to the United States
19th-century American male artists
19th-century English male artists
18th-century English male artists